In the astronomy of the Solar System,  is a sub-kilometer asteroid, classified as near-Earth object that belongs to the  Apollo group. It measures approximately 40–90 meters. During a close approach to Earth, it was first observed 25 January 2017, by the ATLAS survey at Haleakala Observatory, Hawaii, United States.

Orbit 

 has a low-eccentricity orbit with a semi-major axis only slightly larger than that of Earth. It orbits the Sun at a distance of 1.008–1.023 AU once every 1.02 years (374 days). Its orbit has an eccentricity of 0.01 and an inclination of 11° with respect to the ecliptic. The body is too small to be classified as a potentially hazardous asteroid.

July 2017 flyby 

On 23 July 2017, it passed by within 3.15 lunar distances. Seen from the Earth it passed straight north to south from Draco south into Scorpio. With its 1.023 year orbit it has a synodic period of 43 years with the earth, so it will flyby the Earth every 43 years or so. JPL Small-Body Database's simulator show the previous flyby in July 1973 and next one will be in July 2061.

References

External links 
 MPEC 2017-B69 : 2017 BS5
 
 

Minor planet object articles (unnumbered)

20170723
20170125